Gaius Samuel Turner (August 12, 1838 – April 25, 1892) was a businessman and political figure in New Brunswick, Canada. He represented Albert County in the Legislative Assembly of New Brunswick from 1879 to 1892 as a Liberal-Conservative.

He was born and educated in Albert County, New Brunswick, the son of Isaac Turner and Elizabeth Colpitts. In 1876, he married Lucy E. Stiles. He was a justice of the peace. Turner was a ship builder in Harvey, New Brunswick, and also was a director for the Albert Railway. He was named to the province's Executive Council in 1883 but resigned later that year. He died in office at Fredericton at the age of 53 after a long illness.

References

Further reading
[http://www.canadiana.org/ECO/mtq?doc=32953 The Canadian parliamentary companion and annual register, 1879, CH Mackintosh
Bradley T. Shoebottom, "The Shipbuilding Career of Gaius S. Turner of Harvey Bank, NB, 1874-1892", The Northern Mariner (Canadian Nautical Research Society), Volume 10, No 3, 2000

1838 births
1892 deaths
Progressive Conservative Party of New Brunswick MLAs
People from Albert County, New Brunswick